Chieftains 2 is the second album released by the Irish musical group The Chieftains in 1969. It was Peadar Mercier's album debut on bodhran and Seán Keane's on fiddle.

When Seán Ó Riada disbanded Ceoltoiri Chualann in 1969, several of the players wanted to continue the sound they had pioneered. The result was the reformation of The Chieftains. "The Foxhunt" had previously been known as a piper's tune, but here it was given a full band treatment, and was widely played, as a direct result of this recording.

Track listing

"Banish Misfortune / Gillian's Apples"  – 
"Seóirse Brabston (Planxty George Brabazon)"  – 
"Bean an Fhir Rua (The Red-Haired Man's Wife)"  – 
"Pis Fhliuch (The Wet Quirn) (O' Farrells Welcome to Limerick)"  – 
"An Páistín Fionn (The Fair-Haired Child)/ Mrs. Crotty's Reel / The Mountain Top"  – 
"The Foxhunt"  – 
"An Mhaighdean Mhara (The Sea Maiden) / Tie the Bonnet / O' Rourke's Reel"  – 
"Callaghan's Hornpipe / Byrne's Hornpipe"  – 
"Pigtown / Tie the Ribbons / The Bag of Potatoes"  – 
"The Humours of Whiskey / Hardiman the Fiddler"  – 
"Dónall Óg"  – 
"Brian Boru's March"  – 
"Sweeney's / Denis Murphy's / The Scartaglen Polka"  –

Personnel
The Chieftains
Paddy Moloney – uillean pipes, tin whistle, arrangements
Martin Fay – fiddle
Seán Potts – tin whistle
Seán Keane – fiddle
Michael Tubridy – flute, concertina, tin whistle
Peadar Mercier – bodhrán, bones
Technical
Edward Delaney - artwork
John S. Perrett - design
Iona Print Ltd., Glasnevin, Dublin 9 - lithography

References

Sources and links
 

1969 albums
The Chieftains albums
Irish-language albums
Claddagh Records albums